The Toyota KR engine family is a straight-3 piston engine, designed by Daihatsu, a subsidiary of Toyota. The 1KR series uses aluminium engine blocks and chain driven DOHC cylinder heads. It uses multi-point fuel injection, and has 4 valves per cylinder. Some versions have VVT-i variable valve timing. The engine is exceptionally light:  with all ancillaries. This is due to the nature of the applications and weight of city cars.

1KR-FE
The 1KR-FE is a  version built in Japan and Poland. When originally on sale it met European emission standard EU4 requirements and had  levels of 109 g/km, but current applications meet European emission standard EU5 and can have  levels as low as 99 g/km. This engine has been given the 2007, 2008, 2009 and 2010 International Engine of the Year awards in the sub-1.0 liter category.

The engine was also adapted to meet European emission standard EU6 and can have  levels as low as 88/89 g/km in Toyota Aygo or Citroën C1/Peugeot 108 since 2014 in NEDC.

Applications 
 Daihatsu Boon/Toyota Passo/Daihatsu Sirion/Subaru Justy
 Toyota Aygo/Citroën C1 (2005–2021)
 Toyota Vitz/Yaris (2005–present)
 Toyota Belta (2006–2012)
 Toyota iQ (2008–2015)
 Daihatsu Cuore L276 (2007–2013)
Peugeot 107 (2005–2014)
 Peugeot 108 (2014–2021)
 Daihatsu Thor/Toyota Tank/Toyota Roomy/Subaru Justy (2016–present)

1KR-DE

The 1KR-DE is the non-VVT-i variant of the 1KR engine made by Daihatsu. It produces less power and torque than the 1KR-FE.

The 1KR-DE was specially designed for the Indonesian LCGC (Low Cost Green Car) market to reduce cost. The cylinder head cover is made from a light weight plastic-resin material. The exhaust manifold is integrated to the cylinder head together with the catalytic converter and oxygen sensor to save even more weight as well as helping the engine to warm up quicker, reducing total exhaust emissions.

Applications 
 Daihatsu Ayla (2013–2023)
 Toyota Agya/Wigo (2013–2017)
 Daihatsu Hi-Max, based on tenth generation Hijet Truck (2016–2019)

1KR-DE2
The 1KR-DE2 is the more powerful variant of the 1KR-DE engine which is redesigned by Perodua. The compression ratio for this engine is 11:1.

Applications 
 Perodua Axia (2014–2017)

1KR-VE

The 1KR-VE is a more powerful variant made by Perodua specifically improved version from the 1KR-DE2 which is made for the newest edition in the Perodua family. New 1.0-litre VVT-i engine is lighter & compact for better fuel consumption, better performance, reduced vibration & noise level. It was specifically made for the 1.0-litre variant for Perodua's first solely in-house manufactured car which is the Perodua Bezza. It is a modified and refined version of the 1KR-DE2 engine from the Perodua Axia. The new 1KR-VE engine now features variable-valve timing with intelligence (VVT-i) on the intake valves. Several minor changes and refinements were also introduced for increased fuel efficiency and more linear power delivery. Notable changes include a higher 11.5:1 compression ratio, a high-tumble intake port, a longer intake manifold, micro fuel spray injection and low-friction valve lifters.

Applications 
Perodua Bezza (2016–present)
Daihatsu Sigra (2016–present)
Perodua Axia (B200) (2017–present)
Perodua Axia (A300) (2023–present)
Toyota Wigo (2017–2023)
Toyota Agya (2017–2021)
 Daihatsu Ayla (2023–present)

1KR-VET

The 1KR-VET (996 cc) is a turbocharged version of the 1KR-FE with lowered compression ratio of 9.5:1 and redline of 6200 rpm. Produced by Daihatsu for use in the top-of-the-range version of the Daihatsu Thor and the A200/A250 series Rocky.

Applications 
Daihatsu Thor/Toyota Tank/Toyota Roomy/Subaru Justy (2016–present)
Daihatsu Rocky/Toyota Raize (2019–present)
Perodua Ativa (2021–present)

1KR-B52
Revised version used in PSA Citroën C1/Peugeot 108 since 2016. First appeared in Citroën C1 UrbanRide and Elle special editions and later rolled out to all.

Applications 
 Citroën C1/Peugeot 108 (2016–2021)
 Toyota Aygo X (2022–present)

See also

 List of Toyota engines

References

KR
Straight-three engines
Gasoline engines by model